Vincenzo Cisoni, O.P. (died 1583) was a Roman Catholic prelate who served as Bishop of Sant'Agata de' Goti (1572–1583).

Biography
Vincenzo Cisoni was ordained a priest in the Order of Preachers.
On 6 Feb 1572, he was appointed during the papacy of Pope Pius V as Bishop of Sant'Agata de' Goti.
He served as Bishop of Sant'Agata de' Goti until his death on 17 Jan 1583.

References

External links and additional sources
 (for Chronology of Bishops) 
 (for Chronology of Bishops) 

16th-century Italian Roman Catholic bishops
Bishops appointed by Pope Pius V
1583 deaths
Dominican bishops